Eswatini competed at the 2022 Commonwealth Games in Birmingham, England between 28 July and 8 August 2022. It was Eswatini's fourteenth appearance at the Games, and the first since its previous appearances as Swaziland.

Track athlete Sibusiso Matsenjwa and swimmer Hayley Hoy were the country's flagbearers during the opening ceremony, while boxer Thabiso Dlamini and track athlete Bongiwe Mahlalela served as the closing ceremony flagbearers.

Competitors
Eswatini sent a contingent of 11 competitors to the Games.

The following is the list of number of competitors participating at the Games per sport/discipline.

Athletics

A squad of five athletes took part in the competition.

Men
Track and road events

Women
Track and road events

Boxing

A squad of two boxers took part in the competition.

Men

Cycling

A squad of two cyclists took part in the competition.

Road
Men

Swimming

A squad of two swimmers took part in the competition.

References

External links
EOCGA Facebook site

Nations at the 2022 Commonwealth Games
Eswatini at the Commonwealth Games
2022 in Swazi sport